Planá may refer to the places in the Czech Republic:

Chodová Planá, a market town in the Plzeň Region
Horní Planá, a town in the South Bohemian Region
Planá (České Budějovice District), a municipality and village in the South Bohemian Region
Planá (Tachov District), a town in the Plzeň Region
Planá nad Lužnicí, a town in the South Bohemian Region
Planá, a village and administrative part of Hromnice in the Plzeň Region
Planá, a village and administrative part of Klučenice in the Central Bohemian Region

See also
Plana (disambiguation)